Wallace James Hood Sr. (February 9, 1895 – May 2, 1965), was a professional baseball player who played outfielder for the Pittsburgh Pirates and the Brooklyn Robins from 1920 to 1922. He served as an umpire in the Pacific Coast League from 1935 to 1943. He appeared in the baseball film Warming Up (1928), the first sound feature released by Paramount Pictures.

Prior to his professional baseball career, Hood served in the United States Army Air Forces during World War I. During his military service, he reached the rank of second lieutenant.

His son, Wally Hood, Jr. pitched for the New York Yankees in 1949 for two games.

External links

1895 births
1965 deaths
United States Army Air Service pilots of World War I
Major League Baseball outfielders
Brooklyn Robins players
Pittsburgh Pirates players
Baseball players from California
Vancouver Beavers players
Moose Jaw Robin Hoods players
Salt Lake City Bees players
Seattle Indians players
Los Angeles Angels (minor league) players
Reading Keystones players
Memphis Chickasaws players
Sacramento Senators players
Burials at Rose Hills Memorial Park